The 1986 Australian Football Championships Night Series was the 8th edition of the AFC Night Series, a VFL-organised national club Australian rules football tournament between the leading clubs from the VFL and the SANFL.

The 1986 Series would be the last to be played under the AFC banner as the VFL began its transformation from a state league to a national competition with the introduction of two interstate expansion clubs, the Brisbane Bears and the West Coast Eagles. As a result, the AFC Board was disbanded and the following year's Night Series was reverted to a VFL-run competition featuring only the VFL teams.

Qualified teams

1 Includes previous appearances in the Championship of Australia and NFL Night Series.

Venues

Knockout stage

Round 1

Lucky loser playoff

Quarterfinals

Semifinals

Australian Football Championships night series final

References

Australian rules interstate football
History of Australian rules football
Australian rules football competitions in Australia
1986 in Australian rules football